Summit Downtown Historic District is a historic district in Summit, New Jersey, roughly bounded by Springfield Ave, the Village Green, Summit Ave, and Waldron Ave. The district was listed on the state register on November 17, 2010, and the federal register on June 6, 2011.

See also
National Register of Historic Places listings in Union County, New Jersey

References 

Summit, New Jersey
Historic districts in Union County, New Jersey
National Register of Historic Places in Union County, New Jersey